James Haslam (1 April 1842 – 31 July 1913) was a British politician, representing Chesterfield as an MP from 1906 to 1913

Before entering Parliament in 1906, Haslam had been a founder member and served as a leading official of the Derbyshire Miners’ Association (DMA) since its inception some 30 years earlier. He was returned in 1906 as a Liberal candidate, but won the two General Elections of 1910 as a Labour candidate.

He died in 1913 in Chesterfield aged 71.

He currently has a statue outside the former Miner's Offices on Saltergate at Chesterfield.

References

J. E. Williams, The Derbyshire Miners A Study in Industrial and Social History, 1962

External links 
 

1842 births
1913 deaths
Liberal-Labour (UK) MPs
Labour Party (UK) MPs for English constituencies
Members of the Parliament of the United Kingdom for constituencies in Derbyshire
Members of the Parliamentary Committee of the Trades Union Congress
Miners' Federation of Great Britain-sponsored MPs
UK MPs 1906–1910
UK MPs 1910
UK MPs 1910–1918
Presidents of the Trades Union Congress
People from Chesterfield, Derbyshire
Liberal Party (UK) MPs for English constituencies
19th-century British businesspeople